The antbirds  are a large family, Thamnophilidae, of smallish passerine bird species of subtropical and tropical Central and South America. The family has more than 230 species divided into 63 genera and includes the antshrikes, antwrens, antvireos, fire-eyes, bare-eyes and bushbirds. The most closely related species to the antbirds are the gnateaters (family Conopophagidae) and the crescentchests (family Melanopareiidae).

List and classification of genera
The list of genera below follows the World Bird List maintained by Frank Gill, David Donsker and Pamela Rasmussen on behalf of the International Ornithologists' Union. The division of the genera into subfamilies and tribes follows the phylogeny published by Jan Ohlson and colleagues in 2013 as well as the list maintained by Joseph del Hoyo on the Handbook of the Birds of the World Alive website. For more detail, see list of antbird species.

Subfamily Euchrepomidinae
Genus Euchrepomis – antwrens (4 species)

Subfamily Myrmornithinae
Genus Myrmornis – wing-banded antbird
Genus Pygiptila – spot-winged antshrike
Genus Thamnistes – antshrikes (2 species)

Subfamily Thamnophilinae
Tribe Microrhopiini
Genus Microrhopias – dot-winged antwren
Genus Neoctantes – black bushbird
Genus Clytoctantes – bushbirds (2 species) (Placement here is provisional)
Genus Epinecrophylla – stipplethroats (8 species)
Genus Myrmorchilus – stripe-backed antbird
Genus Aprositornis – Yapacana antbird
Genus Ammonastes  – grey-bellied antbird 
Genus Myrmophylax – black-throated antbird
Tribe Formicivorini 
Genus Myrmotherula – antwrens (24 species)
Genus Terenura – antwrens (2 species)
Genus Myrmochanes – black-and-white antbird
Genus Formicivora – antwrens (9 species)
Tribe Thamnophilini
Genus Dichrozona – banded antbird
Genus Rhopias – star-throated antwren
Genus Isleria – antwrens (2 species)
Genus Thamnomanes – antshrikes (4 species)
Genus Megastictus – pearly antshrike
Genus Sakesphoroides - silvery-cheeked antshrike
Genus Herpsilochmus – wren-like antshrikes (16 species)
Genus Dysithamnus – antvireos (8 species)
Genus Thamnophilus – antshrikes (30 species)

Genus Sakesphorus – antshrikes (2 species)
Genus Radinopsyche – Caatinga antwren 
Genus Biatas – white-bearded antshrike (Placement here is provisional)
Genus Cymbilaimus – antshrikes (2 species)
Genus Taraba – great antshrike
Genus Mackenziaena – antshrikes (2 species)
Genus Frederickena – antshrikes (3 species)
Genus Hypoedaleus  – spot-backed antshrike
Genus Batara – giant antshrike
Genus Xenornis – speckled antshrike (Placement here is provisional) 

Tribe Pithyini
Genus Pithys (2 species)
Genus Phaenostictus – ocellated antbird
Genus Gymnopithys (3 species)
Genus Oneillornis (2 species)
Genus Rhegmatorhina (5 species)
Genus Phlegopsis – bare-eyes (3 species)
Genus Willisornis (2 species)
Genus Drymophila (11 species)
Genus Hypocnemis – warbling-antbirds (8 species)
Genus Sciaphylax (2 species)
Genus Cercomacroides (6 species)
Genus Cercomacra (7 species)
Tribe Pyriglenini
Genus Myrmoderus (5 species)
Genus Hypocnemoides (2 species)
Genus Hylophylax (3 species)
Genus Sclateria – silvered antbird
Genus Myrmelastes (8 species)
Genus Poliocrania – chestnut-backed antbird
Genus Ampelornis – grey-headed antbird
Genus Sipia (4 species) 
Genus Myrmeciza – white-bellied antbird
Genus Myrmoborus (5 species)
Genus Gymnocichla – bare-crowned antbird
Genus Pyriglena – fire-eyes (3 species)
Genus Rhopornis – slender antbird (Placement here is provisional)
Genus Percnostola (2 species)
Genus Akletos (2 species)
Genus Hafferia (3 species)

Phylogeny
Phylogeny based on a study of the suboscines by Michael Harvey and colleagues published in 2020. Seven genera in the antbird family were found to be paraphyletic: 
Clytoctantes, Drymophila, Dysithamnus, Formicivora, Herpsilochmus, Myrmotherula and Sakesphorus.

References

Further reading

Irestedt, Martin; Fjeldså, Jon; Nylander, Johan A. A. & Ericson, Per G. P. (2004): Phylogenetic relationships of typical antbirds (Thamnophilidae) and test of incongruence based on Bayes factors. BMC Evol. Biol. 4: 23.  Supplementary information
 Isler, M., P. Isler, B. Whitney, and K. Zimmer (2007). Species limits in the "Schistocichla" complex of Percnostola Antbirds (Passeriformes: Thamnophilidae). Wilson Bull. 119(1): 53–70.
 Isler, M., P. Isler, and B. Whitney (2007). Species limits in Antbirds (Thamnophilidae): The Warbling Antbird (Hypocnemis cantator) complex. Auk 124(1): 11–28.
 Isler, M., D. Lacerda, P. Isler, S. Hackett, K. Rosenberg, and R. Brumfield (2006). Epinecrophylla, a new genus of antwrens (Aves: Passeriformes: Thamnophilidae). Proceedings of the Biological Society of Washington 119(4): 522-527

Antbirds